This is a list of members of the Parliament of Albania following the outcome of the parliamentary election of 2009.

Berat County

Dibër County

Durrës County

Elbasan County

Fier County

Gjirokastër County

Korçë County

Kukës County

Lezhë County

Shkodër County

Tirana County

Vlorë County

Replaced members
1. Ferdinand Xhaferraj resigned for candidature for Durrës at the Albanian local elections in 2011. He was replaced by Ndriçim Babasi.
2. Lulzim Basha resigned for candidature for Tirana at the Albanian local elections in 2011. He was replaced by Kosta Barka.
3. Fatos Tushe resigned for candidature for Lushnje at the Albanian local elections in 2011. He was replaced by Arion Muçaj.
4. Gjok Jaku resigned for candidature for Lezha at the Albanian local elections in 2011. He was replaced by Ndrec Deda.
5. Gëzim Dibra died during office, for that reason he is replaced by Ramiz Çobaj.
6. Adrian Kollozi resigned for candidature for Vlorë at the Albanian local elections in 2011. He was replaced by Aurel Bylykbashi.
7. Rudina Seseri resigned

References
Albanian Parliament list

2009
Albania